Edward Stevens Henry (February 10, 1836 – October 10, 1921) was an American businessman and politician from Connecticut who served as a Republican member of the United States House of Representative for Connecticut's 1st congressional district from 1895 to 1913.  He also served as the 44th Treasurer of Connecticut from 1889 to 1893 and in the Connecticut House of Representatives, the Connecticut Senate and as mayor of Rockville, Connecticut.

Early life
Henry was born in the town of Gill, Massachusetts and moved with his parents at age 13 to Rockville, Connecticut in 1849.  He attended the public schools and engaged in the dry-goods business. He was the organizer of the People's Saving Bank in Rockville and Treasurer from 1870 to 1921.  He was a farmer and breeder of thoroughbred stock.

Career
He served as a member of the Connecticut House of Representatives in 1883 and of the Connecticut Senate from 1887 to 1888. He served as delegate at large to the Republican National Convention in 1888, Treasurer of the State of Connecticut from 1889 to 1893 and as the 3rd mayor of Rockville from 1894 to 1895.

Henry was elected as a Republican to the Fifty-fourth and to the eight succeeding Congresses (March 4, 1895 – March 3, 1913). He served as chairman of the Committee on Expenditures on Public Buildings (Sixtieth and Sixty-first Congresses). He declined to be a candidate for renomination in 1912.

He resumed his former mercantile pursuits in Rockville, Connecticut where he died on October 10, 1921. He was interred in Grove Hill Cemetery.

Legacy
Henry Park in Rockville, Connecticut is located on land donated by Henry and named in his honor.

Footnotes

References

|-

|-	

|-

1836 births
1921 deaths
19th-century American businesspeople
19th-century American politicians
20th-century American businesspeople
20th-century American politicians
American bankers
Burials in Connecticut
Republican Party Connecticut state senators
Mayors of places in Connecticut
Republican Party members of the Connecticut House of Representatives
State treasurers of Connecticut
People from Gill, Massachusetts
People from Rockville, Connecticut
Republican Party members of the United States House of Representatives from Connecticut